Vdovin (masculine) or Vdovina (feminine) is a Russian surname. Notable people with the surname include:

Vdovin:
Aleksey Vdovin (born 1963), Russian water polo player
Andrey Vdovin (born 1994), Russian sprinter
Mikhail Vdovin (born 1967), Russian sprinter

Vdovina:
Daria Vdovina (born 1989), Russian sport shooter
Kseniya Vdovina (born 1987), Russian sprinter

Russian-language surnames